The 2013 Utah Utes football team represented the University of Utah during the 2013 NCAA Division I FBS football season. The team was headed by ninth year head coach Kyle Whittingham and played their home games in Rice-Eccles Stadium in Salt Lake City, Utah. They were members of the South Division of the Pac-12 Conference.

Schedule

Rankings

Game summaries

Utah State
Sources:

Weber State

Sources:

Oregon State

Sources:

BYU

Sources:

UCLA

In this series, UCLA has a 9–2 overall record and 3–2 in Salt Lake City. Utah has won two of the last three games with UCLA (2007 and 2011, under Kyle Whittingham). UCLA won last year 21–14.

1st quarter scoring: UCLA – Jordon James 1-yard run (Ka'imi Fairbairn kick); Utah – Dres Anderson 54-yard pass from Travis Wilson (Andy Phillips kick); Utah – Sean Fitzgerald 6-yard pass from Wilson (Phillips kick)

2nd quarter scoring:  UCLA – Brett Hundley 7-yard pass to Devin Fuller (Fairbairn kick); UCLA – Jordan Payton 17-yard pass from Hundley (Fairbairn kick); Utah – Phillips 44-yard field goal

3rd quarter scoring: UCLA – Fairbairn 33-yard field goal

4th quarter scoring: Utah – Keith McGill 19-yard interception of Hundley pass (Phillips); UCLA – Fairbairn 47-yard field goal; UCLA – Hundley 36-yard run (Fairbairn kick); UCLA – Hundley 36-yard run (Fairbairn kick); Utah – Phillips 44-yard field goal

Stanford

1st quarter scoring: STAN – T. Gaffney 1-yard run (J. Williamson kick); UTAH – Karl Williams 4-yard pass from Travis Wilson (Andy Phillips kick); STAN – T. Montgomery 100-yard kickoff return (Williamson kick);
UTAH – Dres Anderson 51-yard pass from Wilson (Phillips kick)

2nd quarter scoring: UTAH – Anderson 3-yard run (Phillips kick)

3rd quarter scoring: UTAH – Phillips 23-yard field goal

4th quarter scoring: UTAH – Phillips 48-yard field goal; STAN – D. Cajuste 7-yard pass from K. Hogan (Williamson kick)

Arizona

USC

1st quarter scoring: UTAH – Andy Phillips 42-yard field goal; USC –  Nelson Agholor 30-yard pass from Cody Kessler (Andre Heidari kick)

2nd quarter scoring: USC – Heidari 35-yard field goal; USC – Heidari 38-yard field goal; USC – Heidari 28-yard field goal

3rd quarter scoring: USC – Heidari 40-yard field goal

4th quarter scoring: None

Arizona State

Oregon

Oregon leads the series with Utah 18-8 (0.692). The series began in 1933 at Oregon, Oregon 23, Utah 7. The last meeting was the 2009 game at Oregon, Oregon 31, Utah 24.

1st quarter scoring: ORE – De'Anthony Thomas 8-yard pass from Marcus Mariota (Matt Wogan kick); ORE – Wogan 31-yard field goal

2nd quarter scoring: UTAH – Jake Murphy 34-yard pass from Adam Schulz (Andy Phillips kick); ORE – Josh Huff 5-yard pass from Mariota (Wogan kick)

3rd quarter scoring: UTAH – Schulz 4-yard run (Phillips kick); ORE – Thomas 86-yard kick return (Wogan kick missed); ORE – John Mundt 14-yard pass from Mariota (Wogan kick); ORE – Byron Marshall 17-yard run (Wogan kick)

4th quarter scoring: ORE – Marshall 16-yard run (Wogan kick); UTAH – Bubba Poole 10-yard run (Phillips kick)

Washington State

References

Utah
Utah Utes football seasons
Utah Utes football